Oh Boy! is a 1938 British comedy film directed by Albert de Courville and starring Albert Burdon, Mary Lawson and Bernard Nedell. It was made at Elstree Studios by ABPC. The film's sets were designed by the art director John Mead.

Synopsis
Percy Flower, a young chemist, takes his girlfriend to watch his Beefeater father on parade at the Tower of London, but she is stolen away by an assertive, taller man. Percy is then given a secret formula by an eccentric inventor which makes him extremely confident, strong and energetic. However once Percy starts suffering the side effect, which reduces him back to childhood, his father urgently tries to find the Professor again to get the antidote. Eventually Percy is restored to his true self, managing both to win back his girlfriend and to foil a plot by some American gangsters to steal the Crown Jewels.

Cast
 Albert Burdon as Percy Flower
 Mary Lawson as June Messenger
 Bernard Nedell as Angelo Tonelli
 Jay Laurier as Horatio Flower
 Robert Cochran as Albert Bolsover
 Edmon Ryan as Butch
 Maire O'Neill as Mrs. Baggs
 Syd Walker as Sergeant
 Charles Carson as Governor
 Jerry Verno as Shopwalker
 John Wood as Man
 Billy Milton as Conductor
 Edmund D'Alby
 Boris Ranevsky

References

Bibliography
 Low, Rachael. Filmmaking in 1930s Britain. George Allen & Unwin, 1985.
 Wood, Linda. British Films, 1927-1939. British Film Institute, 1986.

External links

1938 films
British comedy films
1938 comedy films
Films directed by Albert de Courville
Films shot at Associated British Studios
British black-and-white films
1930s English-language films
1930s British films